The Flow of Things is a live album by jazz saxophonist Roscoe Mitchell recorded in 1986 for the Italian Black Saint label.

Reception
The Allmusic review by Stephen Cook awarded the album 3 stars stating "The Flow of Things is probably not the best entrée into Mitchell's work, but after a few Art Ensemble of Chicago records and one of his earlier efforts, make sure to come back for a listen".

Track listing
All compositions by Roscoe Mitchell
 "The Flow of Things No. 1" – 10:29
 "The Flow of Things No. 2" – 10:11
 "Cards for Quartet" – 9:14
 "The Flow of Things No. 3" – 13:18
Recorded at the Goetz Theater in Chicago, Illinois on June 29, 1986 (tracks 3 & 4) and the Raccoon Club in Chicago, Illinois on September 7, 1986 (tracks 1 & 2)

Personnel
Roscoe Mitchell – soprano saxophone, alto saxophone
Jodie Christian – piano
Malachi Favors – bass
Steve McCall – drums

References

Black Saint/Soul Note albums
Roscoe Mitchell live albums
1986 live albums